Hidemi Miyashita (born 11 May 1957) is a Japanese weightlifter. He competed in the men's flyweight event at the 1984 Summer Olympics.

References

1957 births
Living people
Japanese male weightlifters
Olympic weightlifters of Japan
Weightlifters at the 1984 Summer Olympics
Place of birth missing (living people)